Messiah  is a compilation album by American heavy metal band Fear Factory, released in 1999 by Roadrunner Records. It includes one song from Soul of a New Machine, six from Demanufacture, two from Remanufacture, and one bonus track from Obsolete. It is the soundtrack to the 2000 video game Messiah.

Track listing

Fear Factory albums
1999 greatest hits albums
Roadrunner Records compilation albums
Video game soundtracks